The Lebedev Physical Institute of the Russian Academy of Sciences (LPI RAS or just LPI) (in ), situated in Moscow, is one of the leading Russian research institutes specializing in physics. It is also one of the oldest research institutions in Russia: its history dates back to a collection of physics equipment established by Peter the Great in the Kunstkamera of Saint Petersburg in 1714. The institute was established in its present shape in 1934 by academician Sergey Vavilov. It moved to Moscow and was named after a prominent Russian physicist Pyotr Lebedev the same year. It is also known as P. N. Lebedev Institute of Physics or just Lebedev Institute. In Russian it is often referred to by the acronym FIAN (ФИАН) standing for "Physical Institute of the Academy of Sciences".

The wide range of the research activities includes: laser technology, dark matter structure, nanostructures, superconductivity, cosmic rays, and gamma-astronomy. The institute developed a technique of crystallizing cubic zirconia (which was called Fianit in Russia, named after FIAN).

Directors of the Institute
 Sergey Vavilov (1934–1951)
 Dmitri Skobeltsyn (1951–1972)
 Nikolay Basov (1973–1988)
 Leonid Keldysh (1988–1994)
 Oleg Krokhin (1994–2004)
 Gennady Mesyats (2004–2015)
  (2015–)

Nobel prizes awarded to FIAN scientists

 1958 — Pavel Cherenkov, Igor Tamm, Ilya Frank: "for the discovery and the interpretation of the Cherenkov-Vavilov effect".
 1964 — Nikolay Basov, Alexander Prokhorov: "for fundamental work in the field of quantum electronics, which has led to the construction of oscillators and amplifiers based on the maser-laser principle".
 1975 — Andrei Sakharov won a Peace Prize for his campaigning for human rights.
 2003 — Vitaly Ginzburg: "for pioneering contributions to the theory of superconductors and superfluids".

Facilities 

The institute has, among other research facilities, a particle accelerator: 1.2 GeV electron synchrotron called "Pakhra", located in Troitsk near Moscow (at the LPI's HEP department). However, the institute is not totally (or even perhaps mainly) focused on accelerator/particle physics, but the scope of the research of the institute contains most of the areas of modern physics.

Publications of the Institute
 "Краткие сообщения по физике" ; English version: Bulletin of the Lebedev Physics Institute
"Квантовая электроника" ; English translation: Quantum Electronics (formerly Soviet Journal of Quantum Electronics)

Films about the Lebedev Physical Institute
In 2021 it was released a documentary “Mishik Kazaryan: The Path of an Explorer” (2021) ( https://www.youtube.com/watch?v=WWuZsXSCFxo ). The film (original title «Мишик Казарян: путь Искателя») was directed by Leonid Ioffe. It narrates about the life and work of Professor Mishik Kazaryan, an experimental physicist, laureate of the USSR State Prize, who worked in the Lebedev Physical Institute. The film also allows to immerse into the life of the Lebedev Physical Institute since middle of 1960-s.

See also
 
 Pushchino Radio Astronomy Observatory

External links
 Lebedev Physics Institute official web site

Physics institutes
Universities and institutes established in the Soviet Union
Research institutes in the Soviet Union
Institutes of the Russian Academy of Sciences
Nuclear research institutes in Russia
1714 establishments in Russia
Cultural heritage monuments in Moscow